Odhner is a Swedish family. Notable members include:

People
Clas Theodor Odhner (1836–1904), Swedish historian, director of the Swedish National Archives
Willgodt Theophil Odhner (1845–1905), Swedish engineer and inventor of the Odhner Arithmometer working in Russia
Nils Johan Teodor Odhner (1879–1928), Swedish arctic explorer and zoologist who studied trematodes and decapod crustaceans
Nils Hjalmar Odhner (1884–1973), Swedish zoologist who studied mollusks

Other
Odhner Arithmometer, a mechanical calculator invented by Willgodt Theophil Odhner
AB Original-Odhner, a Swedish company manufacturing Odhner calculators
Facit-Odhner, a subsidiary of Facit AB, which bought AB Original-Odhner in 1942

References
Hans Gillingstam, "Odhner", Svenskt biografiskt lexikon, vol. 28.

Swedish families
Swedish-language surnames
Surnames